Logical Design Works, Inc. is a now-defunct US-based video game developer that developed games between 1983 and 1993. The name comes from the initials of the founder Lucjan Daniel Wencel.

Games 
 1985 Phantasie
 1987 Phantasie III
 1987 Vegas Gambler
 1988 TrianGO
 1989 Blockout
 1989 Street Rod
 1989 Tunnels of Armageddon
 1991 Street Rod 2: The Next Generation
 1993 Ancient Glory

References

External links 
 

Defunct video game companies of the United States